Dhan Lal Thokar is a Nepalese politician who is elected member of Provincial Assembly of Madhesh Province from Nepali Congress. Thokar, a resident of Chandrapur Municipality, Rautahat was elected to the 2017 provincial assembly election from Rautahat 4(A).

Electoral history

2017 Nepalese provincial elections

References

External links

Living people
Members of the Provincial Assembly of Madhesh Province
Madhesi people
People from Rautahat District
Nepali Congress politicians from Madhesh Province
1966 births